Parsonsia eucalyptophylla, whose common names are gargaloo and monkey vine, is a woody vine in the family Apocynaceae. It is native to the east coast states of Australia.

Description
Parsonsia eucalyptophylla is a tall woody climber; the young plants climb by clinging roots, and the older plants using twining stems.  It has watery rather than milky sap. The yellow flowers appear from spring to autumn.  The leaves are linear to lanceolate and 8–24 cm long and 0.5–2 cm wide, with lower surface paler than the upper.

Gallery

Distribution and habitat
Parsonsia eucalyptophylla is native to New South Wales, Queensland and Victoria  in Australia, and is widespread in woodland and scrub in inland areas.

Taxonomy
Parsonsia eucalyptophylla was first described in 1861, by Ferdinand von Mueller, and later redescribed, in 1868, as Lyonsia eucalyptifolia  by Bentham. Its currently accepted name is Parsonsia eucalyptophylla.

References

eucalyptophylla
Flora of New South Wales
Flora of Queensland
Flora of Victoria (Australia)
Plants described in 1861
Vines
Taxa named by Ferdinand von Mueller